Cinema Paithiyam is a 1975 Indian Tamil-language drama film, directed by Muktha Srinivasan. The film stars Jaishankar and Jayachitra. It is a remake of the Hindi film Guddi (1971). The film was released on 31 January 1975. Jayachitra later claimed in an interview that this film ran for 100 days at Devi-Sridevi Complex in Madras, and that "this was the first Tamil black-and-white film that ran for so long in that theater complex."

Plot 

Jaya is a cinephile. So obsessed is she with cinema, that she worships the popular actor Jaishankar, believing all that he portrays on screen, to be his real self. He becomes the ideal man of her dreams, and she even tattoos his name in her arm. Hell breaks loose when she refuses to marry Natarajan, the boy arranged by her brother and her sister-in-law. At his juncture, steps in her uncle, who takes it upon himself to show her the true world, by taking her on a trip around the real life of a star.

Cast

Soundtrack 
The music was composed by Shankar–Ganesh, with lyrics by Kannadasan.

Reception 
Kanthan of Kalki positively reviewed the film, comparing it favourably to the Hindi original.

Notes

References

External links 
 

1970s Tamil-language films
1975 drama films
1975 films
Cultural depictions of actors
Films directed by Muktha Srinivasan
Films scored by M. S. Viswanathan
Indian black-and-white films
Indian drama films
Tamil remakes of Hindi films